Little Athens is a 2005 American independent film directed by Tom Zuber, which stars John Patrick Amedori, Erica Leerhsen, DJ Qualls, Rachel Miner, Eric Szmanda, Michael Peña, and more. Despite premiering at Toronto International Film Festival in 2005, it wasn't released on DVD until November 21, 2006.

Plot
Little Athens follows a whirlwind day in the hapless lives of small town youth caught in a dead-end post-high school void. The journeys of four groups of late teens/early twenty-somethings unfold through four different storylines, their separate trails converging at an explosive house party.

Cast
 John Patrick Amedori as Jimmy
 Erica Leerhsen as Heather
 DJ Qualls as Cory
 Rachel Miner as Allison
 Eric Szmanda as Derek
 Shawn Hatosy as Carter
 Michelle Horn as Emily
 Jorge Garcia as Pedro
 Jill Ritchie as Jessica
 Michael Peña as Carlos
 Kenny Morrison as Aaron
 Leonardo Nam as Kwon
 R.J. Knoll as Brad
 Forrest Landis as Kevin
 Esteban Powell as Troy
 Mary-Pat Green as Mrs. Carlson
 Tory Kittles as Sinjin

External links
 
 
 

2005 films
2000s crime comedy-drama films
2005 romantic comedy-drama films
American crime comedy-drama films
American romantic comedy-drama films
American teen comedy-drama films
American teen romance films
American independent films
2000s teen comedy-drama films
2005 independent films
2005 comedy films
2005 drama films
2000s English-language films
2000s American films